Svein is a Norwegian masculine given name which may refer to:

Rulers
 Sweyn Haakonsson (died c. 1016), in Norwegian Svein Håkonsson, an earl and co-ruler of Norway from 1000 to c. 1015
 Svein Knutsson (c. 1016–1035), King of Norway as Sweyn II

Politicians, civil servants and businessmen
 Svein Aaser (born 1946), Norwegian business executive
 Svein Alsaker (born 1940), Norwegian politician
 Svein Olav Agnalt (born 1949), Norwegian politician
 Svein Fjellheim (born 1945), Norwegian trade unionist and politician
 Svein Flåtten (born 1944), Norwegian politician
 Svein Gjedrem (born 1950), Norwegian economist and former Governor of the Central Bank of Norway
 Svein Gjelseth (born 1950), Norwegian politician
 Svein Roald Hansen (born 1949), Norwegian politician
 Svein Harberg (born 1958), Norwegian businessman and politician
 Svein Kristensen (born 1946), Norwegian civil servant, former Director of the Norwegian Tax Administration
 Svein Longva (1943–2009), Norwegian economist and civil servant
 Svein Ludvigsen (born 1946), Norwegian politician
 Svein Lundevall (born 1944), Norwegian civil servant
 Svein Munkejord (born 1948), Norwegian politician
 Svein Olsen Øraker (1886–1963), Norwegian politician
 Svein Harald Øygard (born 1960), Norwegian economist and head of the Central Bank of Iceland in 2009
 Svein Rennemo (born 24 July 1947), Norwegian businessman and chair of Statoil
 Svein Ole Sæther (born 1948), Norwegian diplomat
 Svein Sundsbø (born 1943), Norwegian businessman and politician

Academics
 Svein Bjerke (born 1938), Norwegian religious historian and professor emeritus at the University of Oslo
 Svein Hatløy (1940–2015), Norwegian architect and professor
 Svein B. Manum (born 1926), Norwegian botanist and professor
 Svein Mønnesland (born 1943), Norwegian Slavist and professor

Athletes
 Svein Engen (born 1953), Norwegian former biathlete
 Svein Fjælberg (born 1959), Norwegian former footballer
 Svein Grøndalen (born 1955), Norwegian retired footballer
 Svein Haagensen (born 1939), Norwegian former ice hockey player
 Svein Hansen (1943–2012), Norwegian ice hockey player
 Svein Gaute Hølestøl (born 1971), Norwegian former cyclist
 Svein Jacobsen, Norwegian orienteering competitor in the 1970s
 Svein Morten Johansen (born 1971), Norwegian retired footballer
 Svein Kvia (1947–2005), Norwegian footballer
 Svein Langholm, Norwegian former cyclist who won the Norwegian National Road Race Championship in 1975
 Svein Lilleberg (born 1958), Norwegian cross-country skier and Paralympic multi-gold medalist
 Svein Mathisen (1952-2011), Norwegian footballer
 Svein Enok Nørstebø (born 1972), Norwegian former ice hockey player
 Svein Ivar Sigernes (born 1949), Norwegian former football player and coach
 Svein Sigfusson (1912-1992), Canadian athlete and entrepreneur
 Svein Thøgersen (born 1946), Norwegian rower and 1972 Olympic silver medalist
 Svein Tuft (born 1977), Canadian cyclist
 Svein Inge Valvik (born 1956), Norwegian retired discus thrower

Artists and entertainers
 Svein Berge (born 1976), Norwegian electronic musician, half of the duo Röyksopp
 Svein Olav Blindheim (born 1954), Norwegian jazz bass player, composer and writer
 Svein Erik Brodal (born 1939), Norwegian actor, theatre director, poet, novelist and politician
 Svein Christiansen (born 1941), Norwegian jazz drummer
 Svein Finnerud (1945–2000), Norwegian jazz pianist, painter and graphic artist
 Svein Sturla Hungnes (born 1946), Norwegian actor, theatre director and instructor
 Svein Jarvoll (born 1946), Norwegian poet, novelist, short story writer, translator and essayist
 Svein Dag Hauge (born 1956), Norwegian jazz guitarist and record producer
 Svein Olav Herstad (born 1969), Norwegian jazz pianist
 Svein Koningen (born 1946), Norwegian abstract expressionist painter
 Svein Nyhus (born 1962), Norwegian illustrator and writer of children's books
 Svein Øvergaard (1912-1986), Norwegian jazz musician and band leader and boxer
 Svein Scharffenberg (born 1939), Norwegian actor and stage director
 Svein Tindberg (born 1953), Norwegian actor

Other
 Svein Blindheim (1916–2013), Norwegian military officer and member of the resistance during World War II
 Svein Gjerdåker (born 1963), Norwegian newspaper editor
 Svein Heglund (10 December 1918 – 18 June 1998), Norwegian engineer, World War II pilot and major general
 Svein Johannessen (1937–2007), Norwegian chess player
 Svein Døvle Larssen (1928–2015), Norwegian newspaper editor
 Svein Rosseland (1894–1985), Norwegian astrophysicist
 Svein Urdal (born 1941), Norwegian former chief of police and former Director of the Norwegian Police Surveillance Agency

See also
 Sveinn
 Sweyn
 Sven

Norwegian masculine given names